Jorge Gabriel Báez Mendoza (born 23 October 1990) is a Paraguayan football midfielder who currently plays for side Resende.

In the summer of 2014, Báez left Olimpia where he played for the four seasons. He joined Argentine Primera División side Arsenal along with compatriot Enzo Prono, signing a one-and-half-year deal.

He was hired in 2016 to Resende compete in the Campeonato Carioca.

References

1990 births
Living people
Sportspeople from Asunción
Paraguayan footballers
Paraguayan expatriate footballers
Expatriate footballers in Argentina
Paraguayan expatriate sportspeople in Argentina
Expatriate footballers in Brazil
Association football midfielders
Cerro Porteño players
Club Olimpia footballers
Arsenal de Sarandí footballers
Deportivo Capiatá players
Resende Futebol Clube players